Canada Bay is a suburb in the Inner West of Sydney, in the state of New South Wales, Australia.

Canada Bay is also a bay on Parramatta River between Concord and Five Dock. The suburb of Canada Bay sits on the southern shore and is bordered by the suburbs of Burwood and Croydon. The City of Canada Bay takes its name from the bay but its administrative centre is located in the suburb of Drummoyne.

History 

The name Canada Bay honours a link between Australia and Canada. Following the Lower Canada Rebellion of 1837 to 1838, two Irish and 58 French Canadian rebels were deported to Australia. At the request of the local Catholic bishop, they were brought to Sydney. Imprisoned at Longbottom Stockade (which was located at what is now Concord Oval), the convicts broke stone for the construction of Parramatta Road and collected oyster shells for making lime. In 1842, the French Canadians were allowed to work outside the prison. Between 1843 and 1844, all received pardons and, except for two people who died and one (Joseph Marceau) who settled in Dapto, all returned to Canada.

After the rebellions, John Lambton, 1st Earl of Durham, Governor General and Lord High Commissioner to British North America recommended that Britain grant responsible self-government to the Union of Upper and Lower Canada. Many parts of Canada Bay are a reminder of this history: Exile Bay, France Bay, Durham Street, Marceau Drive, Polding Street and Gipps Street. Bayview Park has a plaque that honours the exiles and marks the point of disembarkation.

The City of Canada Bay was formed in December 2000 by the merger of Concord and Drummoyne councils.

Demographics
According to the 2016 census, there were 1,238 residents in Canada Bay. 63.8% of people were born in Australia. 59.6% of people spoke only English at home. Other languages spoken at home included Italian at 13.6%. The most common responses for religion were Catholic 42.1%, No Religion, so described 22.2% and Anglican 8.8%.

References

External links 

 City of Canada Bay website
 Canada Bay and the Canadian Exiles
 Canada in Australia: Canadian Department of Foreign and International Affairs

Lower Canada Rebellion
Suburbs of Sydney
City of Canada Bay